Scarlet sage may refer to either of two plants in the genus Salvia (sages and claries):

 Salvia coccinea – Blood sage
 Salvia splendens – Tropical sage

Salvia